The Twenty20 East Asia Cup is a quadrangular cricket tournament played between teams representing China, Hong Kong, Japan and South Korea. From 2015 to 2019 the tournament rotated on a year-by-year basis from either a men's or women's tournament. The first edition took place in 2015, a women's tournament in South Korea. The first men's tournament took place the following year in Japan. The 2019 women's tournament was the first to be played with full Twenty20 International (T20I) status, after the International Cricket Council (ICC) had granted T20I status to matches between all of its members.

The was no tournament in 2020, after it was cancelled due to the COVID-19 pandemic. In May 2021, the four cricket associations signed an agreement for the next four editions of the women's tournament which would become an annual event. Hong Kong are scheduled to host the 2021 edition, and Japan, China and South Korea hosting the next three editions, respectively.

Tournaments summary

Men's

Women's

References

International cricket competitions in Hong Kong
International cricket competitions in Japan
International cricket competitions in South Korea